Terri Dunning (born 11 March 1985) is a former British swimmer. She specialised in butterfly and won medals at the 2005 Summer Universiade, 2006 European Aquatics Championships and 2006 Commonwealth Games.

See also
 List of Commonwealth Games medallists in swimming (women)

External links
British Swimming athlete profile

1985 births
Living people
English female swimmers
Female butterfly swimmers
Commonwealth Games silver medallists for England
Commonwealth Games bronze medallists for England
Swimmers at the 2006 Commonwealth Games
European Aquatics Championships medalists in swimming
Commonwealth Games medallists in swimming
Universiade medalists in swimming
Universiade bronze medalists for Great Britain
Medalists at the 2005 Summer Universiade
Medallists at the 2006 Commonwealth Games